The Glitter Band are a glam rock band from England, who initially worked as Gary Glitter's backing band under that name from 1973, when they then began releasing records of their own. They were unofficially known as the Glittermen on the first four hit singles by Gary Glitter from 1972 to 1973.

The Glitter Band had seven UK Top 20 hit singles in the mid-1970s, and three hit albums.

Early career and commercial success
When Gary Glitter's first single "Rock and Roll Parts 1 and 2" became a number 2 hit in the UK, his manager Mike Leander realised that he would need a backing band and contacted John Rossall who was then the musical director of the Boston Showband. With a few changes in personnel, the Boston Showband became the Glittermen, and later The Glitter Band in 1973 who were:  John Rossall (trombone and musical director), Gerry Shephard (lead guitar and vocals), Pete Phipps (drums and keyboards), Tony Leonard (drums), John Springate (bass and vocals) and Harvey Ellison (saxophone). They backed Glitter in live performances, although in the studio Mike Leander played all the instruments, apart from the brass section provided by Rossall and Ellison.

In 1973, Rossall approached Leander with the suggestion that the band record some material without Glitter. Leander agreed, but rejected the first recordings. The band then went back into the studio and recorded the Rossall/Shephard composition "Angel Face", which met with Leander's approval, but not without some changes. The band, now working as a separate entity with Tony Leonard having replaced Pete Gill, as well as continuing to back Glitter, played a few well-received live shows before their first single came out, mixing some new songs with cover versions of 1950s and 1960s songs. In March 1974, "Angel Face" was released on Bell Records, reaching number four in the UK Singles Chart, and outselling Glitter's "Remember Me This Way" that week, though this song ultimately peaked higher at #3. Further hits followed between 1974 and 1976, along with the release of four albums. Rossall left the band on 31 December 1974. Gerry Shephard, John Springate and Pete Phipps taking over leadership, with Springate taking lead vocal duties on hits such as the ballad "Goodbye My Love", "The Tears I Cried", and "People Like You". Sales dropped in 1976, with the advent of punk rock. The band switched to CBS Records and later Epic Records, and changed their name to The G Band to disassociate themselves from Glitter, but failed to find another hit single. The name reverted to The Glitter Band in March 1977 for the release of "Look What You've Been Missing", co-written by John Rossall and Gerry Shephard.

May 1977 saw the band release a final single as the Glitter Band, "She Was Alright". Finally Springate, Phipps and Shephard released "Gotta Get a Message Back To You" in September 1977, under the new name of Air Traffic Control. The single, written by Springate and Phipps, never made it past a few initial commercial pressings on the Epic label. In 1979, Shephard and Phipps worked with former Sparks keyboard player Peter Oxendale, recording the US only album Put Your Money Where Your Mouth Is as Oxendale and Shephard. They regrouped as The Glitter Band in 1980 with the addition of Eddy Spence on keyboards and Brian Jones replacing Harvey on sax. Further sporadic releases followed in the 1980s on a variety of labels. Trevor Horn played bass guitar for the band in this era. The band's profile was maintained with a slew of Greatest Hits releases, mainly concentrating on their peak mid-1970s era.

Reformation
Guitarist/singer Gerry Shephard and drummer/pianist Pete Phipps (Eurythmics, XTC, reformed the band in 1987, and successfully performed in the UK and Europe, including tours with Gary Glitter, until 2001 when they split up. Shephard and former drummer Tony Leonard formed one band, whilst Phipps continued to perform with his own band. After Rossall was taken to court in 1983, an injunction banned him from using Glitter in his band name; a second legal ruling in 1997, after Rossall had persistently breached the first order, resulted in him receiving a one-year suspended prison sentence which would come into force if he used the Glitter name again. Rossall was subsequently not allowed to use Glitter Band as part of his band's name, but was allowed to advertise his historical connections to the band. With Shephard's death in May 2003, Leonard retired to concentrate on musical production activities in Norway, whilst both Phipps and Rossall continued on the road with their own bands.  Shephard and Phipps had previously guested on Denim's Back In Denim (1992).

Later career
Pete Phipps still performs live as The Glitter Band. In April 2010, The Glitter Band performed at Scala, Kings Cross, London where they were joined by special guests Angie Bowie and Adam Ant. Rossall and Harvey Ellison continued to tour with their band, releasing the album Glitteresque in 2008, which was subsequently withdrawn from circulation by their record company because of trademark infringement. Following Ellison's death in 2017, Rossall continued to tour for the rest of his life.

Springate and Shephard also wrote the UK's 2000 Eurovision Song Contest entry, "Don't Play That Song Again" performed by Nicki French.

Phipps and Shephard appeared in the Identity Parade line-up on the first episode of Never Mind The Buzzcocks, recorded on 28 October 1996.

In December 2013, John Rossall released a new single, a Glitter styled version of the classic "White Christmas". In 2014 the song "Angel Face" was included on the soundtrack of the hit Spanish film The Face of an Angel.

Springate retired from the band in 2019, and in August 2020 Phipps, the only remaining original member, released his first solo album entitled Wherever You Are.

John Rossall died on 2 October 2021, at the age of 75.

Discography

Albums
 Hey (1974) UK No. 13, AUS No. 16
 Rock 'n' Roll Dudes (1975) UK No. 17, AUS No. 35
 Listen to the Band (1975) 
 Makes You Blind (1975), Arista (same songs as Listen To The Band) released outside UK
 Paris Match (1977)

Live albums
 Live at the Marquee (1986)
 Glitz Blitz, Live! (1998), MCI
 Greatest Hits ...Live! (2001), Armoury

Compilations
 Greatest Hits (1976) UK No. 52
 The Collection (1990)
 Pop Fire (1994), Pilz
 Let's Get Together Again (1996)
 20 Glittering Greats (1998), Music Club
 Solid Silver: The Ultimate Glitter Band Vol. 1 (1998), Edsel
 The Best of the Glitter Band (1999)
 The Glitter Band: The Bell Singles Collection (2000)
 Greatest Hits (2002)

Singles

Members

Current
 Pete Phipps – drummer, keyboardist (1973–1979, 1985–present)
 Dominic Rodgers – guitarist (2001–present)

Former
 John Rossall – trombonist, saxophonist (1973–1974); died 2021
 Harvey Ellison – saxophonist, guitarist, pianist, backing vocals (1973–1977); died 2017
 Pete Gill – drummer (1973)
 Bob Edmunds – saxophonist (1973)
 Gerry Shephard – guitarist, lead and backing vocals (1973-1979, 1981–2001); died 2003
 John Springate – bassist, lead and backing vocals (1973–1979, 1981–1987, 2009–2019)
 Tony Leonard – drummer (1973–1977, 1981–1985)
 Eddy Spence – keyboardist (1981–1987, 2009–2019)
 Brian Jones – saxophonist (1981–1985)
 Terry Popple – drummer (1981–1983)

Film appearances
Remember Me This Way (1974), as themselves
Never Too Young to Rock (1975), as themselves

References

External links
The Official Glitter Band Website - The Glitter Band
The Official Website for Pete Phipps and The Glitter Band
 John Rossall's Official Website + Detailed History of the Boston Showband/Glitter Band
 
High Court documents
 

1973 establishments in England
English glam rock groups
Gary Glitter
Musical groups established in 1973
Bell Records artists
Epic Records artists
Musical backing groups